Mantel clocks—or shelf clocks—are relatively small house clocks traditionally placed on the shelf, or mantel, above the fireplace.  The form, first developed in France in the 1750s, can be distinguished from earlier chamber clocks of similar size due to a lack of carrying handles.

These clocks are often highly ornate, decorative works.  They are most frequently constructed from any combination of ormolu, porcelain, and wood. One of the most common and valued types of mantel clocks are the French Empire-style timepieces.

Simon Willard's shelf clock (half clock, Massachusetts shelf clock) was a relatively economical clock which was produced by the celebrated Simon Willard's Roxbury Street workshop, in Boston, Massachusetts, around the first decades of the 19th century. Right after inventing the banjo clock, Simon Willard brought the design further, designing the similar Massachusetts shelf clock which was related to the traditional bracket clocks. Simon's new creation ran for eight days.

Specifications
In contrast to wall clocks, whose movements were attached to the back board, the shelf clock had its movement supported by a seat board. In the 1790s in Boston, Simon Willard began selling other standardized shelf clocks. Indeed, it looked like a standard tall clock whose hood and base were directly conjoined and whose body was missing. These models included both a second hand and a calendar dial.

Georgian era
Simon Willard's shelf clocks were weight-driven and some models had an extended base for the weight so they achieved a one-week running period. Also, they had a pinwheel escapement. Their strike mechanism was the rack and snail. The pendulum length could be adjusted through a hole in the clock face at the 12 o'clock position, so it was not necessary to open the case.

Victorian decorative arts
Some later shelf clocks featured two artistically finished glass tablets which were beside the circular dial. The whole clock was mounted on lion paws. Willard's shelf clocks were produced until the 1830s. The Willard Brothers revolutionized the clock manufacturing by both labor division and using multiple previously molded parts. However, it is commonly accepted that historically their clocks were not definitively popular. Instead, Eli Terry popularized the clock ownership among common American people. Nowadays, Simon Willard's clocks are recognized as American masterpieces. As such, they are avidly sought by both antiquarians and museums. A Simon Willard clock in perfect condition can be purchased for anywhere from $50,000 up to $250,000.

Edwardian
Carriage clock

In popular culture
An animated figure of a mantel clock, "Cogsworth", is a character in Disney's films, Beauty and the Beast (1991; animated), voiced by David Ogden Stiers, and Beauty and the Beast (2017; live action/CGI), portrayed by Ian McKellen.

See also
 Bracket clock
 Chariot clock 
 Connecticut shelf clock
 French Empire mantel clock
 Lighthouse clock
 Massachusetts shelf clock
 Simon Willard

Clock designs